Branko Bulatović (10 December 1951 – 26 March 2004) was a Montenegrin football administrator. He was the general secretary of the Football Association of Serbia and Montenegro at the time of his assassination in 2004.

Death
On 26 March 2004, an unknown assailant walked up to Bulatović and shot him twice in the back of the head in the lobby of the Football Association of Serbia and Montenegro headquarters. Bulatović was rushed to the Military Medical Academy where he went into a coma. He later succumbed to his injuries.

Personal life
He had two children: a daughter and a son named Blažo who was a footballer.

References 

1951 births
2004 deaths
2004 murders in Serbia
People from Kolašin
Serbs of Montenegro
Serbian businesspeople
Serbian sports executives and administrators
University of Belgrade Faculty of Law alumni
People murdered in Serbia
Unsolved murders in Serbia
Assassinated Serbian people
Assassinations in Serbia
Burials at Belgrade New Cemetery
Yugoslav businesspeople